Ian Douglas Trezise (born 30 September 1959) is an Australian politician. He was a Labor Party member of the Victorian Legislative Assembly from 1999 to 2014, representing the seat of Geelong.

Background 
Trezise was born and raised in Geelong, the son of high-profile Labor minister and AFL footballer Neil Trezise, and is of Cornish descent. He was educated at Newcomb Primary and Geelong High School before completing a postgraduate diploma in personnel management. Ian worked for the Australian Workers' Union for a number of years, before becoming shipping manager at the Port of Geelong. He was a Geelong City Councillor from 1989 to 1993. He is married with two children.

Parliamentary career 
Trezise was first elected in 1999, when he won the seat of Geelong by a very narrow 16 votes, as part of the dramatic 1999 Victorian state election. In the 2002 election he substantially increased his majority with an 8.5% swing, and he maintained that vote in the 2006 state election. In the 2010 election his margin was slashed to 2.1%.

He served on the parliamentary Road Safety Committee from 1999 until November 2010, and was chairman from 2003 to 2006.

Trezise resigned as the Member for Geelong at the 2014 Victorian state election. He was succeeded by Christine Couzens, a member of his staff since he was elected in 1999.

References

See also

 Geelong, Victoria
 Neil Trezise

1959 births
Living people
Australian Labor Party members of the Parliament of Victoria
Australian people of Cornish descent
Members of the Victorian Legislative Assembly
Politicians from Geelong